Lo que le pasó a Reynoso is a 1937 Argentine drama film directed and written by Leopoldo Torres Ríos. The film was based on a play by Alberto Vaccarezza and premiered in Buenos Aires on February 18, 1937. It starred Floren Delbene.

The film was produced by Julio Joly and the cinematography performed by Carlos Torres Ríos.

Cast
Luis Arata as Serapio
Floren Delbene as Julián Reynoso
Francisco Álvarez as  Sargento Lucero
Herminia Franco
Maria Esther Duckse as  Soña Hilaria
Pedro Maratea
Héctor Bonati
Domingo Sapelli
Teresa Serrador

External links

1937 films
1930s Spanish-language films
Argentine black-and-white films
1937 drama films
Films directed by Leopoldo Torres Ríos
Argentine drama films
1930s Argentine films